Samuel Malthouse (13 October 1857 – 7 February 1931) was an English cricketer who played for Derbyshire between 1890 and 1895.

Malthouse was born  in Whitwell, Derbyshire, the son of John G. Malthouse, a mason, and his wife Ann. Malthouse himself became a mason, He was a notable performer for Whitwell Cricket Club in the 1880s with James Stubbings and 'G G' Walker and all three also played for Welbeck as well as the county.

Malthouse debuted for Derbyshire in the 1890 season, when the club was without first-class status and he was fourth highest scorer and achieved a five wicket innings in 1890. He played regularly for the next three years. He played eight first-class matches during the 1894 season, starting  with a match against Lancashire. After Derbyshire joined the County Championship in the 1895 season, he played one match - a draw against Warwickshire. Malthouse was a left-handed batsman and a right-arm medium-pace and occasional off-spin bowler. He was a lower-order batsman and a consistent and economical bowler.

Malthouse died in Whitwell aged 74.

His son, William Malthouse, played for Derbyshire between 1919 and 1920.

References

1857 births
1931 deaths
English cricketers
Derbyshire cricketers
People from Whitwell, Derbyshire
Cricketers from Derbyshire